Prunum amygdalum, common name : the almond marginella, is a species of sea snail, a marine gastropod mollusk in the family Marginellidae, the margin snails.

Description
The shell size varies between 8 mm and 22 mm

Distribution
This species ioccurs in the Atlantic Ocean off the coast of Senegal.

References

 Cossignani T. (2006). Marginellidae & Cystiscidae of the World. L'Informatore Piceno. 408pp

External links
 

Marginellidae
Molluscs of the Atlantic Ocean
Invertebrates of West Africa
Gastropods described in 1841